The following is a list of general managers, head coaches, and assistant coaches of Asian heritage in sports leagues in the United States and Canada, including the Big Four, other professional leagues and the collegiate NCAA. Some of the appointments listed below made into the list of Asian-American firsts.

Existing Asian coaches reflect that problems of race and sports especially "Asian stereotypes exist at all levels of basketball", which contributes to a factor why there has been a lack of Asian coaches in NCAA basketball. The Asian Coaches Association is the most prominent association representing the causes of Asian basketball coaches.

Women of Asian heritage coaching men's teams in particular encounter stereotypes. In 1998, Kim Ng recalled "she has been treated with kid gloves since being named an assistant GM with the Yankees."

List
  denotes women coaching or overseeing a men's team.

 * denotes present up to December 2021

See also
Asian Americans in sports
List of Asian-American firsts
Race and sports
Terminology
General manager (NBA)
General manager (MLB)
Field manager (MLB)

References

Managers
Lists of Canadian people by ethnic or national origin
Lists of American sportspeople
Lists of Canadian sportspeople
Sports leagues in the United States
Sports leagues in Canada
Sports managers